
Year 888 (DCCCLXXXVIII) was a leap year starting on Monday (link will display the full calendar) of the Julian calendar.

Events 
 By place 

 Europe 
 January 13 – Emperor Charles III (the Fat) dies at Neidingen, after having suffered repeat bouts of an illness that may have been epilepsy. The Frankish Empire is split again, and falls apart into separate kingdoms. Count Odo, the hero of the Siege of Paris, is elected king of the West Frankish Kingdom, and crowned at Compiègne by Walter, archbishop of Sens. Other Frankish noblemen support the 8-year-old Charles the Simple (the posthumous son of the late king Louis the Stammerer).
 October – Alan I (the Great), count of Vannes, and his rival Judicael, unite their forces to defeat the Vikings at Questembert (or 889). Judicael is killed, in a notable victory for the Bretons, with 15,000 Vikings crushed, some few 400 escaping to their ships. In command of a 'united' Breton force, Alan is able to drive the Vikings back to the Loire River. Alan becomes sole ruler of Brittany, and over the Frankish counties of Rennes, Nantes, Coutances and Avranches.
 October – Battle of Milazzo: the Aghlabids score a crushing victory over a Byzantine fleet off Sicily.
 Winter – King Arnulf of Carinthia leads an East Frankish expedition into Italy, after he is recognized as overlord of France and Burgundy. Arnulf descends with an army over the Brenner Pass, and meets King Berengar I at a peace conference at Trento. Berengar grants him two counties in the Val d'Adige (Northern Italy), and does homage to Arnulf as overlord. In turn, Arnulf confirms Berengar as king of Lombardia, and returns to Germany.

 Lord Æthelred II of the Mercians is struck down with a debilitating illness. His wife, Princess Æthelflæd (a daughter of Alfred the Great) of Wessex, joins him as joint ruler of Mercia (approximate date).

 Al-Andalus 
 Al-Mundhir, Moorish emir of Córdoba, dies after a two-year reign (possibly murdered by his brother Abdullah ibn Muhammad al-Umawi, who succeeds him as ruler of the Emirate of Córdoba).

 China 
 April 20 – Emperor Xi Zong (Li Xuan) dies of illness at Chang'an, after a 14-year reign. He is succeeded by his 21-year-old brother Zhao Zong, as ruler of the Tang Dynasty. 

 By topic 

 Religion 
 Shaftesbury Abbey is founded by King Alfred the Great in Dorset. He installs his daughter Æthelgifu as first abbess (approximate date).

Births 
 October 20 – Zhu Youzhen, emperor of Later Liang (d. 923)
 Liu Xu, chancellor of Later Tang and Later Jin (d. 947)
 Vratislaus I, duke of Bohemia (approximate date)
 Zhu Yougui, emperor of Later Liang (approximate date)

Deaths 
 January 13 – Charles the Fat, Frankish emperor (b. 839)
 April 20 – Xi Zong, emperor of the Tang Dynasty (b. 862)
 June 11 – Rimbert, archbishop of Bremen (b. 830)
 June 30 – Æthelred, archbishop of Canterbury
 Áed mac Conchobair, king of Connacht (Ireland)
 Æthelswith, Anglo-Saxon queen 
 Al-Mundhir, Muslim emir of Córdoba
 Cerball mac Dúnlainge, king of Osraige (Ireland)
 Ingelger, founder of the House of Anjou 
 Judicael, duke of Brittany (or 889)
 Le Yanzhen, Chinese warlord
 Nasra of Tao-Klarjeti, Georgian prince
 Sichfrith mac Ímair, king of Dublin
 Tetbert, Frankish nobleman
 Zhang Gui, Chinese warlord
 Zhou Bao, Chinese general (b. 814)

References